M-151, was formerly the designation of two different state trunkline highways in the US state of Michigan. 

M-151 was the original designation of US Highway 12 (US 12) between Niles and Union, Michigan between 1931 and 1935; and
M-151 was the original designation of US 223 in Whiteford Township between Memorial Highway and the US 23 freeway between 1935 and 1977.